William Granger may refer to:

William Granger (MP) (died 1545), Member of Parliament (MP) for Dover
Bill Granger (born 1969), cook, restaurateur and food writer
Bill Granger (author) (1941–2012), American novelist
William Granger (priest) (1891–?), Dean of Nassau
W. R. Granger (William Rowen Granger; 1873–1925), Canadian sports administrator